Kazimir Sas (born 30 November 1982) is an Australian film and television actor. He is best known for his work on children's television series such as Time Trackers, Parallax, Stormworld and The Gift. He has also appeared in All Saints, The Alice and The Shark Net.

Sas is one of the six actors in the 2009 Black Swan State Theatre Company's HotBed Ensemble, a professional development programme for emerging Western Australian artists.

Biography
Sas is the son of actor Igor Sas and brother of actress Francoise Sas, who both appeared with him in the television series Parallax.

References

External links

 HotBed Ensemble

Australian male television actors
Living people
Australian child actors
1982 births